The 2006 Mosconi Cup, the 13th edition of the annual nine-ball pool competition between teams representing Europe and the United States, took place 7–10 December 2006 at the Rotterdam Cruise Terminal in Rotterdam, Netherlands.

The event ended in a 12–12 draw, thus  Team USA retained the Mosconi Cup as the prior year's winner. The possibility of ties was removed for the following year's event.


Teams

Results

Thursday, 7 December

Session 1

Friday, 8 December

Session 2

Session 3

Saturday, 9 December

Session 4

Session 5

Sunday, 10 December

Session 6

Session 7

References

External links
Official website

2006
2006 in cue sports
2006 in Dutch sport
Sports competitions in Rotterdam
December 2006 sports events in Europe